The Atlanta Thrashers were an ice hockey team based in Atlanta. They competed in the National Hockey League (NHL) Eastern Conference's Southeast Division (NHL) before moving to Winnipeg, Manitoba. From their inaugural season in 1999 until 2011, the team played its home games at Philips Arena.

Table key

Season-by-season history

See also
List of NHL seasons
List of Atlanta Flames seasons

Notes
Beginning with the 1999–2000 season, teams received one point for losing a regular season game in overtime.
Before the 2005–06 season, the NHL instituted a penalty shootout for regular season games that remained tied after a five-minute overtime period, which prevented ties.

References

General

Specific

 
Atlanta Thrashers
seasons